Vexillum castum is a species of small sea snail, marine gastropod mollusk in the family Costellariidae, the ribbed miters.

Homonymy 
Sowerby II, 1874 introduced the new replacement name Mitra hastata for Turricula casta H. Adams, 1872 non Voluta casta Gmelin, 1791, both of which he placed in Mitra, but Sowerby's name is preoccupied by M. hastata Karsten, 1849. Since the replacement name is no longer in use and the taxa are no longer considered congeneric (Gmelin's taxon is now called Scabricola casta), Adams' name should be used (ICZN Article 59.3).

Description
The length of the white shell attains 8.5 mm, its diameter 3 mm.

Distribution
This species occurs in the Red Sea; in the Indo-west and Central Pacific: from the Persian Gulf to the Society Islands and Hawaii and the Kermadec Islands; also off Queensland (Australia).

References

 Dautzenberg, P. & Bouge, L.J. 1923. Mitridés de la Nouvelle-Calédonie et de ses dépendances. Journal de Conchyliologie 67(2): 179-259
 Cotton, B.C. 1957. Family Mitridae. Royal Society of South Australia Malacological Section 12: 8 pp.
 Cernohorsky, W.O. 1970. Systematics of the families Mitridae & Volutomitridae (Mollusca: Gastropoda). Bulletin of the Auckland Institute and Museum. Auckland, New Zealand 8: 1-190 
 Cernohorsky, W.O. 1978. Tropical Pacific marine shells. Sydney : Pacific Publications 352 pp., 68 pls.
 Cernohorsky W.O. (1988) The Mitridae, Costellariidae and Nassariidae (Mollusca: Gastropoda) recently dredged at Reunion Island, Indian Ocean, with descriptions of new species. Records of the Auckland Institute and Museum 25: 75-85.

External links
  Adams, H. (1872). Further descriptions of new species of shells collected by Robert M'Andrew, Esq., in the Red Sea. Proceedings of the Zoological Society of London. 1872: 9-12, pl. 3
 Sowerby, G. B. II. (1874). Monograph of the genus Mitra. In G. B. Sowerby II (ed.), Thesaurus conchyliorum, or monographs of genera of shells. Vol. 4 (31-32): 1–46, pls 352–379. London

castum
Gastropods described in 1872